"Falling in Love (Is Hard on the Knees)" is a song by American hard rock band Aerosmith that appeared on the band's 12th studio album, Nine Lives (1997). The song was written by Steven Tyler, Joe Perry, and Glen Ballard, who had signed on to produce Nine Lives. Although he was dropped from the role halfway through production and replaced by Kevin Shirley, Ballard was still credited for his contributions to the album; he also co-wrote "Pink" with Tyler and Perry and "Taste of India" with Tyler and Richard Supa.

Released as a single on February 11, 1997, the song topped the Spanish Singles Chart and reached number two in Canada for four weeks. It also topped the UK Rock Chart and the US Billboard Mainstream Rock chart. Elsewhere, the track peaked at number four in the Czech Republic while reaching the top 10 in Finland and the top 30 in Iceland, Sweden, Switzerland, and the United Kingdom. On the US Billboard Hot 100, it reached number 35.

Background
"Falling in Love" was released as the first major single from Nine Lives in 1997. The horns arrangements were written by lead singer Steven Tyler and David Campbell.

Tyler got the inspiration for the title off a bumper sticker he saw a few years previously. The line "But you like the way I hold the microphone" was a reference to an almost identical line in the Rolling Stones' 1965 song "The Spider and the Fly".

Chart performance
The song was a popular hit around the world, reaching number 35 on the US Billboard Hot 100, number one on the US Mainstream Rock Tracks chart and in Spain, number two in Canada, number 22 on the UK Singles Chart, and number 46 in Australia.

Music video
A music video was produced to promote the single. The video was directed by Michael Bay, and had a surreal landscape described as "12 Monkeys meets Brazil". Many supermodels, such as Angie Everhart, are featured dressed as nurses, dominatrices and princesses. The video for the song won the band a MTV Video Music Award for Best Rock Video in 1997.

Track listings
US CD and cassette single
 "Falling in Love (Is Hard on the Knees)" – 3:25
 "Fall Together" – 4:38

UK and Australian CD single
 "Falling in Love (Is Hard on the Knees)" – 3:25
 "Fall Together" – 4:38
 "Sweet Emotion" – 4:34
 "Season of Wither" – 5:39

Charts

Weekly charts

Year-end charts

Certifications

Release history

References

Aerosmith songs
1997 singles
Columbia Records singles
Music videos directed by Michael Bay
Number-one singles in Spain
Song recordings produced by Kevin Shirley
Songs written by Glen Ballard
Songs written by Joe Perry (musician)
Songs written by Steven Tyler